María Llompart Pons (born 19 October 2000) is a Spanish professional footballer who plays as a midfielder for Liga F club Villarreal CF.

Club career
Llompart started her career at Barcelona's academy.

References

External links
Profile at La Liga

2000 births
Living people
Women's association football midfielders
Spanish women's footballers
People from Baix Llobregat
Sportspeople from the Province of Barcelona
Footballers from Catalonia
Sportswomen from Catalonia
FC Barcelona Femení players
RCD Espanyol Femenino players
SD Eibar Femenino players
Primera División (women) players
FC Levante Las Planas players
Spain women's youth international footballers